Maleklu (also Romanized as Maleklū; also known as Maleklī) is a village in Qarah Quyun-e Jonubi Rural District, Qarah Quyun District, Showt County, West Azerbaijan Province, Iran. At the 2006 census, its population was 211, in 45 families.

References 

Populated places in Showt County